The Golf-Drouot was a nightclub located in the 9th arrondissement of Paris. It began its life in 1955 as a tea room with a miniature golf course, hence its name. It wasn't until 1961 that the Golf-Drouot became a nightclub. With increased popularity the club hosted notable artists such as Free, David Bowie and The Who. The club closed in 1981.

References

Nightclubs in France